Abby Ellin (born 1968) is an American author and journalist. The author of two books, including Duped: Double Lives, False Identities, and the Con Man I Almost Married, she  writes regularly for The New York Times, and has contributed to Time, Newsweek, and The Daily Beast, among other publications.

Ellin grew up in Brookline, Massachusetts, and attended Brookline High School. She holds a BS in communications from Ithaca College, an MFA in creative writing from Emerson College, and a master's degree in international public policy from Johns Hopkins University.

Ellin's first book, Teenage Waistland: A Former Fat Kid Weighs In on Living Large, Losing Weight, and How Parents Can (and Can't) Help,  published in 2007, documents her own experience as an overweight teenager, and examines the psychological, medical, and cultural impact of obesity on adolescents.
Duped: Double Lives, False Identities, and the Con Man I Almost Married was published in January 2019.  Based on her relationship with a man she identifies as The Commander, an ex–Navy Seal who falsely claimed to be the high-level CIA operative mastermind, the book "turns her heartache into a riveting memoir that's also an insightful investigation into the nature of emotional con artists." The book expanded on "The Drama of Deception," a cover story Ellin wrote for Psychology Today in 2015.

Bibliography
TEENAGE WAISTLAND: A Former Fat Kid Weighs In on Living Large, Losing Weight, and How Parents Can (and Can't) Help, PublicAffairs, 2007,  
DUPED: Double Lives, False Identities, and the Con Man I Almost Married, PublicAffairs/Hachette, 2019,

References

External links
 Official website 

1968 births
Living people
American memoirists
Ithaca College alumni
Emerson College alumni
Johns Hopkins University alumni
People from Brookline, Massachusetts
American columnists
American women memoirists
American women columnists
Brookline High School alumni
21st-century American women